Rebecca Akosua Acheampomaa Acheampong (born 15 August 1984), known mononymously as Becca, is a Ghanaian singer, songwriter and actress. She first gained recognition as a contestant on the second season of TV3's annual singing competition Mentor. Her debut studio album Sugar was released in 2007; it earned her five nominations at the 2008 Ghana Music Awards, including Record of the Year for "You Lied to Me". Becca released her second studio album Time 4 Me on 16 May 2013. It features guest appearances from 2face Idibia, MI, King Ayisoba, Trigmatic, Jay Storm and Akwaboah. The album was certified 2x platinum in Ghana. 

Becca's accolades include one Kora Award, one National Youth Achievers Award, four Ghana Music Awards, and three 4Syte TV Music Video Awards. In 2013, she headlined the annual Girl Talk concert, which started in 2011. Becca was ranked 94 on E.tv Ghana's 2013 list of the 100 most influential people in Ghana. In March 2021, 3Music Network included Becca on its list of the Top 30 Most Influential Women in Music. Becca has worked with artists such as Hugh Masakela and MI Abaga.

Life and music career
Rebecca Acheampong was born in Kumasi, Ghana. She is the first girl and fifth born of nine children. Becca was quite active in church and school activities during her childhood. She attended Morning Star and Wesley Girls' High School. She took an interest in showcasing her vocal dexterity at talent shows held at the latter school. She graduated from Croydon College and became a child care and education worker. Becca relocated to Ghana and signed with Kiki Banson's EKB Records. She studied at the Ghana Institute of Management and Public Administration. Becca obtained a master's degree in brands and communication management from the University of Professional Studies (UPSA), and was made valedictorian.

2007–2014: Sugar, Time 4 Me, performances, and "Move" single

Becca started working on her debut studio album Sugar in 2007. The album comprises 12 songs and was recorded in English and Twi. It was preceded by the lead single "You Lied to Me". The song was released in 2007 and features vocals by Kwabena Kwabena. The music video for the song was shot and directed in Ghana. On 13 November 2007, Becca launched the album in Ghana. She featured Hugh Masekela on the song "I Love You". Sugar was launched in South Africa alongside Hugh Masekela's album Live at the Market Theatre.

Becca's second studio album Time 4 Me was released on 16 May 2013. Becca describes the album as a musical journey inspired by her thoughts, emotions and beliefs. The album comprises 20 songs and features guest vocals from 2face Idibia, MI, King Ayisoba, Trigmatic, Jay Storm and Akwaboah. The album produced the singles "Forever", "Push", "Bad Man Bad Girl", "No Away" and "Follow the Leader". Ten thousand copies of the album were given to fans who bought the Thursday edition of Graphic Showbiz newspaper. Time 4 Me was certified 2× platinum in Ghana. Becca went on a nationwide campus tour to promote the album. Becca's 2011 single "Africa Woman" appeared as a bonus on the album; the song is a melodic ode to the strength and character of African women. The music video for "African Woman" was shot and directed in Ghana by Samad Davis; it starts with a quote and transitions into landscape scenes of Becca.

In 2011, Becca released "Forever" and "Push" as the album's lead and second singles, respectively. "Push" features guest vocals by King Ayisoba and Trigmatic. The music video for "Push" was uploaded to YouTube on 17 May 2011 and features cameo appearances from John Dumelo, Yvonne Okoro and Yvonne Nelson. The album's third single "Bad Man Bad Girl" was released in February 2012; it features vocals by 2face Idibia and was recorded in the summer of 2011. The music video for "Bad Man Bad Girl" was shot in Accra and other parts of Ghana. The MI-assisted track "No Away" was released on 22 June 2012, as the album's fourth single. It was recorded in Ghana and Nigeria and mixed in South Africa. The music video for "No Away" was shot in South Africa and uploaded to YouTube on 12 August 2012, at a total length of 4 minutes and 11 seconds. Liquor brand Kasapreko Company Limited and EKB Records spent $50,000 on the video shoot. The production cost for the video made it one of the most expensive videos released by a Ghanaian artist at that time. The video was unveiled during a ceremony at the XL Club in Accra.

On 17 June 2013, Becca released the album's fifth single "Follow the Leader". On 25 June 2013, EKB Records released the music video for her song "Time 4 Me", which was shot in Yokohama and Tokyo. Becca performed at the Accra International Conference Centre for MTN's Heroes of Change television series finale. On 26 July 2013, she performed with recording engineer Kwame Yeboah (and his Ohia beye Ya band) to launch her second studio album in Accra. On 20 December 2013, she headlined the third edition of the Girl Talk concert, which occurred at the National Theatre of Ghana.

On 12 April 2014, Becca released her single "Move". It features vocals by South African group Uhuru and debuted on Bola Ray's Drive Time show on Joy FM. It was produced by Kaywa and written by Becca and Kiki Banson. The music video for "Move" was uploaded to YouTube on 1 May 2014; it features cameo appearances from Yvonne Chaka Chaka and Hugh Masekela. Kwame Dadzie of Flex Ghana reviewed the song and concluded that its rhythm is a replica of "Khona". On 24 March 2014, Allsports Ghana reported that Becca would perform before the kickoff of Ghana Premier League matches to promote the league.

Artistry, humanitarian work and endorsements
Becca's upbringing and surroundings influenced her musical and fashion style. She has established a rescue organization which raises funds to help children affected by HIV/AIDS in Ghana. In 2014, she became a Goodwill ambassador for UNAIDS. On 1 September 2009, GLO Mobile Ghana unveiled Becca as one of its brand ambassadors. Moreover, the Ministry of Youth and Sports unveiled her as one of Ghana's official ambassadors for the 2014 FIFA World Cup.

Gender discrimination
Becca was scheduled to sing Ghana's national anthem at the Baba Yara Stadium during the country's World Cup qualifier match against Zambia in September 2013. Unfortunately for her, she did not perform due to a directive by authorities in charge of the match. Becca expressed her dissatisfaction at the incident while speaking at the UN Cultural Night, which took place at the Alliance Française in Accra. A spokesperson for the Ghana Football Association told Graphic Showbiz they didn't know arrangements had been made for Becca to sing.

Personal life
Becca is married to Nigerian entrepreneur and artist manager Oluwatobi Sanni Daniel; the couple's wedding was held on 18 August 2018, in Accra. She has a girl child.

Relationship controversy
Becca was at the center of her former manager (Kiki Banson)'s controversial divorce from his wife. Banson allegedly divorced his wife in order to marry Becca. Becca's father reportedly disowned his daughter over her intentions to marry her manager.

Discography

Studio albums
Sugar (2007)
Time 4 Me (2013)
Unveiling (2017)

Awards and nominations

Notes

See also
List of Ghanaian musicians
List of Ghanaians

References

External links

Living people
1984 births
People from Kumasi
Alumni of Croydon College
People educated at Wesley Girls' Senior High School
21st-century Ghanaian women singers
Ghana Institute of Management and Public Administration alumni